The 2013 Tiburon Challenger was a professional tennis tournament played on hard courts. It was the seventh edition of the tournament which was part of the 2013 ATP Challenger Tour. It took place in Tiburon, California, United States between 7 and 13 October 2013.

Singles main-draw entrants

Seeds

 1 Rankings are as of September 30, 2013.

Other entrants
The following players received wildcards into the singles main draw:
  Mitchell Frank
  Marcos Giron
  Campbell Johnson
  Daniel Nguyen

The following players received special exempt into the singles main draw:
  Jarmere Jenkins

The following players received entry from the qualifying draw:
  Giovanni Lapentti
  Philip Bester
  Julio Peralta
  Greg Ouellette

The following players received entry from the qualifying draw as lucky losers:
  Marin Bradarić
  Marcelo Arévalo

Champions

Singles

 Peter Polansky def.  Matthew Ebden 7–5, 6–3

Doubles

 Austin Krajicek /  Rhyne Williams def.  Bradley Klahn /  Rajeev Ram 6–4, 6–1

External links
Official Website

Tiburon Challenger
Tiburon Challenger
2013 in American tennis
2013 in sports in California